(AVG), also with Becker & Erler and Geest & Portig additions, is a former (East-)German publishing house founded in Leipzig in 1906 and dissolved in 1991. There was a West-German namesake in Frankfurt am Main and Wiesbaden.

 may also refer to:

  (AKA), a German publisher since 1996
  (Ath), a former German publisher in Potsdam
  (JAVG), a German publisher in Jena

See also 
  (AVA), a German publisher founded in Leipzig in 1992
  (ADEVA), an Austrian publisher in Graz
 , a former publisher in (East-)Berlin
 , a German publisher in Stuttgart
  (SAV), a former German publisher founded 1991 in Heidelberg
 , a German publisher founded in 1946 in Berlin
 Academic Press, an American publisher founded in 1941/1942 in New York
 Kluwer Academic Publishers